The Flashes is a   Local Nature Reserve west of Godalming in Surrey. It is owned by the National Trust and managed by Waverley Borough Council. It is part of Thursley, Hankley and Frensham Commons Sites of Special Scientific Interest, Thursley, Ash, Pirbright & Chobham Special Area of Conservation and Thursley, Hankley & Frensham Commons Special Protection Area,  

Most of The Flashes is a river valley mire with purple moor-grass, cross-leaved heath, common cottongrass, heather, rushes and sphagnum mosses. Part of the site is covered with peat.

There is access from Sandy Lane.

References

Local Nature Reserves in Surrey